As a nickname, Loco or El Loco may refer to:

 Sebastián Abreu (born 1976), Uruguayan footballer
 Willie Alexander (born 1943), American singer and keyboard player
 Daniel Barrera Barrera, Colombian drug lord arrested in 2012
 Marcelo Bielsa (born 1955), Argentine football coach
 Abdalá Bucaram (born 1952), Ecuadorian politician and President of Ecuador (1996–1997)
 René Higuita (born 1966), Colombian retired football goalkeeper
 Martín Palermo (born 1973), Argentine retired footballer
 Ramón Quiroga (born 1950), Peruvian retired football goalkeeper 
 Vicente Rodríguez (baseball) (1891–?), Cuban baseball player in the Negro leagues and other leagues
 Manuel Valdés (born 1931), Mexican actor and comedian
 Juan Manuel Vargas (born 1983), Peruvian footballer

See also 

Lists of people by nickname